A cage antenna (British cage aerial) is a radio antenna where a conventional design has been augmented by replacing a single long conductor with several parallel wires, connected at their ends, and held in position by ring spacers or support struts mounted on a central mast (if any). The "cage" is either mounted around a central mast (either conducting or non-conducting) or suspended from overhead wires.

Purpose

A cage can improve any antenna design by replacing a single wire in any section that carries large, unbalanced (radiating) current; the only issue is whether the improvement will be substantial enough to warrant the extra effort.
The multiple parallel wires electrically simulate a single fat wire, roughly equivalent to a wire with a diameter half as wide as the distance separating the cage wires, giving the modified antenna higher radiation resistance, lowered conductor resistance, and a wider bandwidth   without as much weight and wind resistance as the equivalent fat wire would entail.

Cage aerials have been built in different variants for broadcast stations in the longwave and mediumwave bands. One advantage of the cage aerial is that the supporting tower can be grounded. Grounding the tower allows it to easily be used for other radio services, such as a high mounting point for smaller VHF or UHF antennas. A grounded tower also simplifies the installation of aircraft warning lamps, since their electrical feeds do not need to have special blocking filters to prevent the escape of RF through the power lines. For commercial transmitting towers the height needed for such an antenna is typically not a problem, since the mast height is selected for a TV or FM antenna mounted at its top, which need to be placed high for line-of-sight transmission at such high frequencies.

When used as the main section of a vertical antenna, the cage is usually built to have a length one-quarter of the operating wavelength, and to surround the entire length of the central mast. If the tower is grounded, the cage wires must be electrically insulated from the tower for their entire length, only connected at the top, if at all. The cage electrical connection near the top of the mast is always optional, but usually that connection is made: When the cage wires are all connected to the grounded tower at or near its top, the type of antenna is in some places called a "folded unipole", which was extensively studied by John H. Mullaney in the mid-20th century. When the combination is a "unipole", the cage wires are usually called a "skirt".

The cage wires are always fed at the ring connecting the cage's lower edge, with the other electrical side of the feedpoint always being the ground system, regardless of whether or not the tower itself is grounded.

Example At 1,000 kHz the wavelength is 300 m. Therefore, the minimum  wave height of the cage antenna is a bit less than 75 m for the cage, plus about 2 metres to raise the lower end of the cage out of reach from the ground (depending on the details of the antenna feed, the lower end of the cage can carry a very high RF voltage).

Radio frequency antenna types
Antennas (radio)